Cliffhanger is a beat 'em up, platform game that was released on October 17, 1993 based on the film of the same name.

Plot 
A plane filled with terrorists attempting to steal money from a treasury plane while airborne is shot down by an FBI plane. The terrorists survive and send out a distress signal, to which the main character, Gabe, responds. However, Gabe does not know that the mayday signal is coming from a group of terrorists, and after reaching them, the terrorists capture Gabe's partner, Hal, and hold him hostage. Gabe must then set out and retrieve the money in order to save Hal.

Gameplay 
The game begins with Gabe responding to the call, before Hal being captured. In order to progress through the game, the player must watch out for enemies and either avoid them by jumping or defeat them by attacking with various weapons, such as a knife or a gun. There are also bosses after every few levels, the final boss being Qualen, the leader of the terrorist group. In some versions of the game the player can also collect money bags scattered throughout the levels to increase their game score, up to the possible maximum of 958845.

Reception 

In their review of the Super NES version, Electronic Gaming Monthly deemed the game a poor Double Dragon clone, citing a lack of originality, poor controls, tiresome gameplay, and below average graphics. They were even more condemning of the NES version, saying that the controls suffer from a delay, the soundtrack is grating, and the graphics look like they're from one of the first wave of NES games. Reviewing the Sega CD version, GamePro criticized that the five platforming levels are repetitive to the point of monotony, praised the two snowboarding levels as "extremely challenging and fun", and complained at the game being weighted more towards the platforming levels than the snowboarding levels.

In a retrospective review of the NES version AllGame editor Christopher Michael Baker was heavily critical of the game, calling it "one of the worst gaming experiences you'll ever encounter on any system". Baker criticized the graphics and controls, and referred to it as a "disgrace to video games". 

The game was awarded Worst Movie-to-Game of 1994 by Electronic Gaming Monthly. Mega said it was "a truly disgusting piece of software".

Versions 
There are major gameplay differences between the 16-bit and 8-bit versions of the game. The Genesis/Mega Drive, SNES and Sega CD versions are almost identical and feature gameplay similar to street brawlers like Double Dragon and Final Fight. The Sega CD version contains a 3D snowboarding sequence where the player has to escape from an avalanche. Otherwise the gameplay on the 16-Bit systems is the same across the board. The Amiga, NES, Game Boy and Game Gear versions however contain lower resolution graphics and a simpler side scrolling gameplay.

Legacy 
In December 2012 programmer Chris Shrigley, who worked on the Sega Genesis version, released the source code for educational purposes to the public.

References

External links 
 
 

1993 video games
Action video games
Amiga games
Beat 'em ups
Sony Pictures video games
Epic/Sony Records games
Malibu Interactive games
Nintendo Entertainment System games
Platform games
Super Nintendo Entertainment System games
Game Boy games
Sega Genesis games
Sega CD games
Game Gear games
Video games based on films
Video games developed in the United States
Video games scored by Mark Cooksey
Side-scrolling beat 'em ups
Commercial video games with freely available source code
Psygnosis games
Infogrames games
Single-player video games
Video games developed in the United Kingdom